Dimitri Sedun (born 2 January 1971 in Merke) is a Russian former road cyclist. He is married to cyclist Nicole Brändli.

Major results
1994
 5th Overall Tour de Slovénie
1996
 2nd Road race, National Road Championships
1999
 2nd Memoriał Henryka Łasaka
 3rd Road race, National Road Championships
 4th Overall Tour de Serbie
1st Stage 4
 6th Overall UNIQA Classic
2000
 1st Stage 5 Course Cycliste de Solidarnosc et des Champions Olympiques
2001
 8th Giro della Provincia di Siracusa

References

External links

Russian male cyclists
1971 births
Living people